Jacob van Kittensteyn was the Governor of Dutch Ceylon during the Dutch period in Ceylon. He was appointed on 26 February 1650 and was Governor until 11 October 1653. He was succeeded by Adriaan van der Meyden.

Footnotes 

17th-century Dutch colonial governors
Governors of Dutch Ceylon